Jaume Munar was the defending champion but lost in the semifinals to Juan Ignacio Londero.

Hugo Dellien won the title after defeating Londero 6–0, 6–1 in the final.

Seeds

Draw

Finals

Top half

Bottom half

References

External links
Main draw
Qualifying draw

Uruguay Open - 1
2021 Singles